Wayne Wesolowski is builder of miniature models.

Wesolowski's models have been exhibited at the Chicago Museum of Science and Industry, the Springfield, Illinois Lincoln Home Site, the West Chicago City Museum, RailAmerican, and the National Railroad Museum.

One of his more noted works is a model of Abraham Lincoln's funeral train. This model took 4½ years to build and is 15 feet (4½ meters) long. Wesolowski appeared on an episode of Tracks Ahead featuring this train and his model of Lincoln's home.

Wesolowski has written scores of articles and four books on model building. He has been featured in videos shown on PBS television. Good Morning America selected and showed part of one tape as an example of video education.

Wesolowski holds a Ph.D in Chemistry  from the University of Arizona and teaches chemistry there.

Publications

Notes

External links
 Description of Lincoln funeral train project
 Gallery of Wesolowski models
 Introductory statement at University of Arizona 

Rail transport modellers
21st-century American chemists
Scale modeling
University of Arizona faculty
University of Arizona alumni
Living people
Year of birth missing (living people)